Kimi-Matias Räikkönen (born 17 October 1979), nicknamed "The Iceman", is a Finnish racing driver who competed in Formula One between 2001 and 2021 for Sauber, McLaren, Ferrari, Lotus, and Alfa Romeo. Räikkönen won the 2007 Formula One World Championship while driving for Ferrari; he also managed to finish second overall twice and third three times. Räikkönen is the most successful Finnish Formula One driver by several metrics, and has the fifth-most podium finishes (103), third-most fastest laps (46), and second-most race starts (349) in Formula One history. He is known for his reserved personality and reluctance to participate in public relations events.

Räikkönen's time at McLaren was marred by a succession of unreliable cars, prompting a move to Ferrari in 2007. This change saw him crowned Formula One World Drivers' Champion in his first season, pipping both McLaren drivers—Lewis Hamilton and Alonso—to the title by one point. In 2008, he equalled the record for the greatest number of fastest laps in a season for the second time.

Räikkönen left both Scuderia Ferrari and the sport after the 2009 season, his sole victory that year having come in that season's Belgian Grand Prix due to driving an uncompetitive Ferrari F60. In September 2013, Ferrari announced his re-signing on a two-year contract, beginning in the  season. This contract was subsequently extended until the end of the 2018 season. During his second Ferrari stint, Räikkönen scored 26 podiums, two pole positions, and a victory at the 2018 United States Grand Prix, 113 Grands Prix after his last victory. Räikkönen finished among the top four overall in the championship on multiple occasions during his second Ferrari stint, finishing his total eight-year long Ferrari career with a third place in the 2018 championship.

In the World Rally Championship, Räikkönen drove a Citroën C4 WRC for the Citroën Junior Team in 2010, and a Citroën DS3 WRC for ICE 1 Racing in 2011. His stint in the WRC saw him beat some more experienced rally drivers with a best result of fifth, a stage win and 10th in the championship in both seasons. Concurrently, Räikkönen also competed in NASCAR, making one-off appearances in the Camping World Truck Series and the Nationwide Series in 2011, and the Cup Series in 2022 and 2023. Forbes magazine listed Räikkönen 36th in their 2008 "Celebrity 100" as the 26th highest paid celebrity and fifth highest paid sportsman. The same list in 2009 recorded him as the second highest-paid athlete.

Career

Early career
Räikkönen was born in Espoo, Finland. He had a long line of success in karting from the age of 10. His first race outside Finland was in Monaco when he was 15 years old. During the race, the steering wheel broke, but he continued, informing his mechanic by frantically waving the steering wheel in the air on the home straight. Räikkönen's next Monaco race was also memorable; he was thrown on the wrong side of the safety fence in a first lap collision but continued driving until running out of road. Undeterred, he lifted his kart back onto the track and continued to race. His mechanic thought Räikkönen had retired, but he eventually caught up with the other competitors and finished third. In 1998 he was first in the Nordic Championship at Varna in Norway. In 1999, Räikkönen placed second in the European Formula Super A championship for the Dutch PDB Racing Team – run by 1980 world champion Peter de Bruijn – utilising a Gillard chassis. He also competed in the Formula Ford Euro Cup. By the age of twenty, he had won the British Formula Renault winter series of 1999, winning the first four races of the year. In 2000, he won seven out of ten events in the Formula Renault UK Championship. Combined, over these two series of Formula Renault, he won 13 out of 23 events – a 57% win rate.

Formula One (2001–2009)

Sauber (2001)

On the basis of these results, Peter Sauber gave the Finn a test with the Sauber Formula One team in September 2000 at the Mugello Circuit. On just the second day of the test, Räikkönen lapped half a second quicker than regular driver Pedro Diniz. Sauber had kept the news of his test quiet to distract potential competitors, internally referring to Räikkönen as "Eskimo". After further tests in Jerez and Barcelona, Sauber signed Räikkönen for the  season. However, some critics (including FIA president Max Mosley) voiced concerns over granting an F1 Super Licence to such an inexperienced driver; Räikkönen had only 23 car races to his credit. He was nevertheless granted his licence from the Fédération Internationale de l'Automobile (FIA) after a performance delivery promise by his team boss, Peter Sauber, and scored a championship point in his debut at the 2001 Australian Grand Prix. Reportedly, Räikkönen was asleep 30 minutes before the race.

Räikkönen had a solid debut year, achieving four points-scoring finishes and eight finishes in the top eight. Completing the year with 9 points, Räikkönen, along with teammate Nick Heidfeld, helped Sauber to what was then its best result of fourth place in the Constructors' Championship.

McLaren (2002–2006)

The decision to choose Räikkönen over his Sauber teammate, the Mercedes linked Nick Heidfeld, was heavily influenced by Häkkinen who repeatedly told Ron Dennis "If you wanna win, get the Finn."

2002
Räikkönen scored a third-place podium finish in his first race with McLaren, the 2002 Australian Grand Prix. Although McLaren suffered many engine failures in 2002, Räikkönen scored 24 points and four podiums, and held his own against teammate David Coulthard. Räikkönen came close to winning his first Grand Prix in France but went off track at the Adelaide hairpin with a handful of laps to go, because of oil from the blown engine of Allan McNish's Toyota on the circuit. He finished the race second. He finished the season in sixth place, one place behind his teammate. Together they achieved a solid third place for McLaren in the Constructors' Championship.

2003
At the season-opening , Räikkönen qualified 15th in the spare car. In the race he took the lead before being caught speeding in the pitlane, caused by a software glitch in the car's electronic system. Räikkönen held off Michael Schumacher to finish third. In Malaysia, Räikkönen won his first race after starting from seventh on the grid. During the next round in Brazil, Räikkönen was declared the winner after the race was stopped on lap 55. According to the rules the winner is decided by the race order as of two laps before the race stopped, i.e. lap 53. However a week later, evidence emerged that Giancarlo Fisichella was on lap 56 when the race stopped, therefore the winner was decided by the order at lap 54. This granted the win to Fisichella, with Räikkönen second.

As other teams improved their cars, McLaren, who were still using the 2002 chassis, began to falter in terms of race speed. However, Räikkönen finished second at Imola. At the start of the race, he collided with Antônio Pizzonia, who was stuck on his grid position owing to a launch control problem, causing Räikkönen to retire from the race.

The next few races came down more to strategy rather than speed. While having engine problems, Räikkönen successfully defended second position from Rubens Barrichello in Austria. He came extremely close to winning in Monaco, but lost by less than a second to Juan Pablo Montoya. Starting from the pitlane in Canada after he went off track during qualifying with understeer, Räikkönen finished sixth, more than a minute adrift of race winner Michael Schumacher.

Title rival Michael Schumacher finished fifth taking 4 points advantage from Räikkönen. Räikkönen failed to finish the  after being involved in an accident at the first corner with Ralf Schumacher and Rubens Barrichello.

Michelin were forced to bring in narrower tyres and it seemed as if they had lost the advantage they had been enjoying over Bridgestone all season. McLaren also announced that they would see out the season with the old MP4-17D chassis and would not bring out the MP4-18 as had been planned. Räikkönen eventually finished fourth in the race, losing five championship points to race winner Michael Schumacher.

With one race to go, Schumacher only needed one point to win the championship. Räikkönen would need to win the next race with Schumacher not scoring any points. After qualifying eighth in Japan, Räikkönen finished second while Michael Schumacher just slipped into the points to win his sixth World Championship. Montoya's retirement during the race also meant that Räikkönen finished second in the championship, just two points behind Schumacher. The team also narrowly lost second place in the Constructors' Championship, finishing third, two points behind runners-up Williams, and 12 points behind Ferrari. Mathematically, Williams or McLaren could have won the championship at the final race. The 2003 season was one of the closest of the 2000s.

2004

The  season began with Räikkönen only claiming a single point in the first seven races. His McLaren, especially the Mercedes engine, suffered repeated breakdowns, allowing him to complete just two of the first seven events. After seven rounds Räikkönen had only one point to Michael Schumacher's 60. In Canada, Räikkönen made 5 pit-stops but was classified fifth since the Williams-BMWs and the two Toyotas were disqualified.

Räikkönen finished seventh behind his team-mate, David Coulthard. At Silverstone, Räikkönen took pole and went on to finish second behind Michael Schumacher. Following on from this encouraging display, the McLarens qualified on the second row of the grid in Germany. Both cars got off to a good start, however Räikkönen lost his rear wing on lap 13 of the race while following race leader Michael Schumacher. He retired again from the  after starting from 10th place on the grid, again on lap 13. He also took the fastest lap. The next weekend at Monza, Räikkönen again retired on lap 13, this time owing to electrical problems. At the next race in China, he finished third, only 1.4 seconds behind race winner Rubens Barrichello.

He later managed to make up some ground: he finished sixth, 2.5 seconds behind Alonso. Räikkönen later battled Montoya for the lead and finished 1 second behind him in second. Räikkönen ended the year seventh, with 45 points, only one behind sixth placed Jarno Trulli, and four podiums.

Despite the disappointment of the 2004 season, Räikkönen was still seen as one of the rising stars of the sport, along with BAR's Button, Renault's Alonso and 2005 McLaren teammate Montoya. Many pundits predicted 2005 to be filled with great on-track battles from a resurgent team. He was also referred to by Ross Brawn and Jean Todt as a driver whom Ferrari might consider in the future. In early November 2004, Räikkönen announced his intention to create a racing team with his manager Steve Robertson, to be entitled Räikkönen Robertson Racing (otherwise known as "Double R"), which would compete in Formula Three in 2005.

2005

Räikkönen's start to the  season was less than perfect. The car was reported to be too soft on its Michelin tyres, with the result that it was not generating enough heat to post competitive qualifying times. The best qualifying position that a McLaren driver could manage in the first 3 races was sixth. He looked set for a podium in Malaysia until a faulty tyre valve failed and dropped him out of the points. Bahrain saw him achieve his first podium of the season with a third place behind Renault's Alonso and the Toyota of Jarno Trulli.

Räikkönen then achieved three consecutive poles in San Marino, Spain, and a win after a safety car strategy call by Neil Martin at Monaco. An almost certain win was denied at Imola after a driveshaft failure, but he won the other two races, putting him within 22 points of leader Alonso. He registered strong, comfortable wins at Barcelona, beating Alonso, and at Monte Carlo, never dropping his lead in both races. The resultant vibrations caused his suspension to fail while he led on the final lap, sending him into the tyre wall and handing a further ten points to his rival Alonso. Changing a tyre would have given him a relatively safe third place. However, tyre changes were only allowed in 2005 in cases where a "punctured or damaged tyre" could be changed for "clear and genuine safety reasons" and there was no precedent for whether the stewards would consider a flat-spotted tyre dangerous enough. This incident, in part, resulted in a rules clarification allowing teams to change a flat-spotted tyre without punishment.

Räikkönen, putting in what Ron Dennis called his best ever qualifying lap, qualified third (demoted to 13th) with a significant fuel load. He finished second behind Fernando Alonso. He claimed third place in the race.

In Germany, Räikkönen was comfortably in the lead having dominated all weekend, but suffered a hydraulics failure, handing victory and a further 10 points to Alonso. It was his third retirement while leading a race during the season. On all three occasions, it was championship rival Alonso who took advantage to win. He told a news conference, "We need to work in a better way just to make sure that the car is very reliable." However he went on to take the chequered flag with a convincing victory over Michael Schumacher, albeit after McLaren teammate Montoya retired with driveshaft failure while leading.

Räikkönen won the Hungarian Grand Prix from the most handicapped qualifying position, having had to do his qualifying run first on the notoriously dusty and dirty track because of his early retirement a week earlier at Hockenheim. No other driver had previously managed this feat. It would emerge that he had 5 laps of fuel more than teammate Montoya and 6 more than Alonso during qualifying yet still managed to outpace them. During the race, Räikkönen was forced to take an extra stop when his left-rear tyre delaminated, which dropped him down to 12th. He recovered, but spun his car after pushing too hard while chasing Giancarlo Fisichella. He eventually finished fourth.

He went on to win for the second year in a row in Belgium at Spa-Francorchamps. In the penultimate race of the year, at the Suzuka Circuit in Japan, Räikkönen took his seventh victory of the season after starting 17th on the grid (as rain, and an engine failure for Räikkönen, had mixed up the qualifying grid). The win was secured when he overtook Renault driver Fisichella (who had started third on the grid, and had led most of the race) on the final lap – which Formula One journalist Peter Windsor thought the most impressive move of the race.

Räikkönen received the F1 Racing "Driver of the Year" accolade, and the Autosport "International Racing Driver of the Year" award.

2006

In Bahrain, Räikkönen suffered electronic problems during Friday practice and a spectacular rear suspension breakage during the first qualifying session, which forced him back to 22nd place on the grid. Nevertheless, he drove through the field, ending third behind Alonso and Michael Schumacher. In Malaysia, Räikkönen was hit from behind by Red Bull Racing's Christian Klien on the first lap. The impact caused a left rear suspension failure resulting in Räikkönen retiring from the race.

Having started the year clearly behind Renault, McLaren improved in Australia, where Räikkönen finished second after flat spotting a tyre and losing a wing end-plate, which caused him to fall off the pace somewhat around the midpoint of the race. Chasing down Alonso during the final stages of the race, he set the fastest lap of the race on the final lap, finishing only 1.8 seconds behind the Spaniard. Räikkönen eventually finished fifth, with teammate Montoya ahead in third place. McLaren team boss Ron Dennis blamed what he deemed to be Räikkönen's poor performance for the team's failure to finish in the top two in the race.

However, he managed to get up to fifth place on the first lap of the race. He retained this position for most of the race, finishing in fifth place. A few days after the Spanish Grand Prix, he admitted that he had no chance of winning the 2006 Championship. In Monaco, Räikkönen qualified third. During the race he got up to second and kept pace with Alonso, however he retired during a safety car period after a failed heat shield led to a wiring loom inside the car catching fire. After the retirement he was seen on live TV walking along the Monaco sidewalks with his helmet still on to the harbour and climbing aboard a yacht.

The  at Silverstone saw Räikkönen qualify second behind Alonso and in front of Michael Schumacher. The running order was Alonso, Räikkönen, Schumacher until the second set of pitstops where Räikkönen was demoted to third by Schumacher, a position he held until the end of the race. In Canada, Räikkönen achieved another podium. The  saw Räikkönen qualify his car in sixth. His teammate was now former test driver Pedro de la Rosa in place of Montoya. Räikkönen ended the race in fifth. In Germany, Räikkönen qualified on pole. After a battle with Jenson Button, he finished the race for the first time in his career, ending in third place. Another pole came in Hungary, but he collided with Vitantonio Liuzzi after 25 laps, causing his fourth retirement of the season.

A first turn incident with Scott Speed at the  led to an exploded tyre and suspension damage. After a tyre change, Räikkönen's race ended halfway into the next lap when he crashed into the barrier at turn 4 because of a loss of rear grip. He led the early part of the race until the first pitstops where he was passed by Schumacher. He stayed in second place for the rest of the race. After the race, Schumacher announced that he would retire at the end of the season. Later, Ferrari announced that he would be replaced in the 2007 season by Räikkönen.

The  saw another retirement for Räikkönen due to throttle problems. His last two Grands Prix, in Japan and Brazil, did lead to 2 finishes, but he missed the podium on both occasions. Räikkönen ended his time at McLaren-Mercedes with a fifth place in the World Drivers' Championship, with McLaren placing third in the World Constructors' Championship at the end of a winless year.

Räikkönen's British Formula 3 Championship team Räikkönen Robertson Racing claimed their first major success, with British driver Mike Conway winning the 2006 British F3 International Series title and the prestigious Macau Grand Prix.

Ferrari (2007–2009)
After the 2006 Italian Grand Prix, Ferrari announced that Räikkönen had signed a three-year contract with Scuderia Ferrari for the 2007–2009 seasons. Räikkönen said after the move that he was very happy with this change of events but wished McLaren the best of luck in the future. He became the teammate to Brazilian Felipe Massa, who had been driving for Ferrari since 2006.

2007

In Bahrain, Räikkönen started from third but was passed by McLaren driver Fernando Alonso. He eventually regained third position from Alonso and finished the race third. This took him down to fourth position in the Championship, behind team-mate Felipe Massa. He started 16th and finished eighth.

In Canada, Räikkönen qualified fourth and finished fifth, Räikkönen's team-mate Massa was disqualified. With ten races in the season left, Räikkönen was 26 points behind leader Lewis Hamilton in the Drivers' Championship.

In France, Räikkönen qualified third, but overtook Hamilton at the first corner of the race. He subsequently ran second, behind teammate Massa, for much of the Grand Prix, but overtook the Brazilian during the pit stops and took his second victory of the season. This was the 11th victory of his Formula One career and Ferrari's first 1–2 win of the 2007 season. In the race, he again took the lead through pit stops, first overtaking Lewis Hamilton midway through the race and then putting in fast laps as Fernando Alonso pitted for the second time in the closing stages to pass him. Räikkönen led to the end of the race.

In Hungary, Räikkönen qualified his car in fourth place, but started from third after Fernando Alonso was penalised. In the race he overtook Nick Heidfeld at the start and pressured Hamilton until the end, but had to settle for second, being 0.7s behind Hamilton. He set the fastest lap time on the last lap of the race, commenting after the race: "I was so bored behind Hamilton, I wanted to see how quick I could have been." In Turkey, Räikkönen missed pole position after making a mistake in the final sector of his fast lap, which left him third on the grid. On race day, he overtook Hamilton in the first corner and took second place, which he kept to the end of the race.

At Monza's third practice session, Räikkönen crashed into the tyre wall before entering the Ascari chicane. He qualified in fifth place, and raced in the Ferrari reserve car while suffering from a neck problem. The Ferrari team employed an unusual one-stop strategy, which left him third after Hamilton passed him late in the race on fresh tyres. At Spa-Francorchamps, Räikkönen's favourite circuit, he secured pole position again and took his fourth victory of the season. Massa finished second, Alonso third and Hamilton fourth. This was also Räikkönen's third consecutive Spa win, which placed him among six other drivers with three or more Spa wins.

At the Fuji Speedway in Japan, the only new track on the 2007 calendar, Räikkönen qualified in third position, while Hamilton took pole and Alonso second. In an extremely wet race, which saw the first 19 laps run behind the safety car, both Räikkönen and teammate Massa were badly affected by having to change to extreme wet tyres during the early stages, because the FIA's tyre-rule notification arrived late at Ferrari. Towards the end of the race, Räikkönen moved through the field to third place, but could not pass his fellow countryman Heikki Kovalainen for second.

In qualifying, Hamilton took pole position with a lighter fuel load, while Räikkönen qualified second and Massa third. There was light rainfall at the beginning of the race which prompted the cars to start on intermediate tyres. After the first round of pit stops Hamilton lost grip as his tyres suffered graining, and Räikkönen overtook him. Hamilton retired after sliding into a gravel trap in the pit lane. Räikkönen took his fifth win of the season, that revived his title hopes before the last race of the season. This was also the 200th race win and 600th podium in a World Championship event for Ferrari as a manufacturer (as a team, their 200th win was achieved at the next race in Brazil, and their 600th podium was achieved in 2008 Bahrain Grand Prix). Räikkönen moved to seven and three points behind Hamilton and Alonso in the Drivers' Championship, respectively, going into the last race in Brazil, the first three-way title battle in the final race of the season since .

Massa had taken pole, followed by Hamilton, Räikkönen, and Alonso. At the start of the race Räikkönen passed Hamilton on the outside and lined up behind Massa. Alonso shortly afterwards passed Hamilton, who fell progressively down the order. Räikkönen eventually overtook Massa, who was already eliminated from contention for the Drivers' Championship in the Japanese Grand Prix. Massa's strategy for the second round of pit stops ensured Räikkönen kept the lead. Räikkönen went on to take the chequered flag, which handed him the crown by a single point from Hamilton and Alonso. Championship leader Hamilton eventually finished the race in seventh place, while defending champion Alonso managed third.

While Räikkönen had only one point more than Alonso and Hamilton at the end of the season, he had the most victories (six compared to four by each McLaren driver).

Räikkönen's Drivers' Championship was briefly put into doubt when race stewards began an investigation after identifying possible fuel irregularities in the cars of Nico Rosberg, Robert Kubica and Nick Heidfeld following post-race inspection. Their disqualification and a race reclassification would have seen Hamilton lifted from seventh to fourth in the race result. However the race stewards decided that no sanctions would be given, meaning the results would stand. McLaren appealed against the decision, however the FIA Court of Appeal rejected their appeal on 16 November 2007 thus confirming Räikkönen as the champion. As of the end of the 2022 Formula One season, Räikkönen's 2007 title triumph remains the most recent World Drivers' Championship win for a Scuderia Ferrari driver.

In January 2008, Räikkönen was beaten by Tero Pitkämäki in the race for the annually chosen Finnish Sports Personality of the Year award; finishing in second place in the competition.

2008
His victory in Kuala Lumpur came on the fifth anniversary of his maiden victory at the same track. In Bahrain, Räikkönen qualified in fourth on the grid. He moved up to second place by the third lap and finished in that position, behind his team-mate Felipe Massa. He also secured the lead in the championship.

In Spain, Räikkönen took the 15th pole of his career and his first of the 2008 season. He managed to take his second race win of the season and the fastest lap of the race. Räikkönen overtook Mika Häkkinen in the list of total number of fastest laps and also in terms of podium finishes, making him the highest-ranked Finnish driver in these statistics.

Despite damaging his front wing in the early stages after a collision with fellow Finn Heikki Kovalainen, Räikkönen was still able to set the fastest lap and finish in third place.

In Monaco, Räikkönen qualified in second behind teammate Felipe Massa. Räikkönen stayed second behind Massa until he was given a drive-through penalty for an infringement by the team on his car and dropped down to sixth. He was set for fifth until an incident with Adrian Sutil, when Räikkönen lost control on the damp track after exiting the tunnel, and hit Sutil's car in the rear. Räikkönen's car was not badly damaged and he was able to finish in ninth after replacing his front wing, also setting the fastest lap in the process. After the race, Mike Gascoyne, the Chief Technology Officer of Force India announced they were filing official protests with the stewards over the incident, demanding a ban for Räikkönen. However, the stewards decided not to penalise him.

In Canada, Räikkönen qualified third. In the race, he set the fastest lap during the first stint while catching up with Robert Kubica who was in second place. The safety car was deployed when Adrian Sutil's car broke down in a dangerous position. Both he and Kubica jumped ahead of race leader Hamilton when they pitted during the safety car period. As there was a red light at the end of the pitlane, Räikkönen and Kubica stopped alongside each other and waited for the signal to allow them back onto the circuit. Hamilton failed to notice the red light and hit the rear of Räikkönen's Ferrari, eliminating both cars.

Räikkönen went on to take his 16th pole position in France, which was the 200th pole for Scuderia Ferrari. Räikkönen dominated the race as he set the fastest lap and had a six-second lead until a bank exhaust failure some halfway through the race reduced his engine's power. He gave up the lead to his teammate Massa, but was far enough ahead of Toyota's Jarno Trulli, to secure second place and eight points.

Before the race, Räikkönen pushed noted photographer Paul-Henri Cahier to the ground as he lined up a close-up shot. Räikkönen's manager Steve Robertson claimed the driver was provoked by Cahier touching him with his lens and standing on his belongings, but Cahier disputed this version of events. The race was in wet conditions and Räikkönen stayed third at the first corner behind Hamilton and Kovalainen. He kept pace and got up to second when Kovalainen spun. He then chased after Hamilton, and set the fastest lap as he drew up directly behind the McLaren. During the first pitstop, Ferrari did not change the intermediates on his car in the hope that the track would become dry. However, the track was hit by another shower, and Räikkönen rapidly lost pace, and dropped down to sixth before finally pitting for new tyres. He finished fourth, a lap down.

He was running fifth when the safety car came out after a crash involving Timo Glock. His teammate Felipe Massa was ahead of him on the track, and as a result, Räikkönen was forced to wait behind Massa when the pitlane opened. This dropped him down to 12th, but he eventually finished in sixth.

He lost a position to Alonso at the beginning of the race but managed to finish third owing to Hamilton's tyre puncture, passing Alonso during the pitstops and Massa's retirement after an engine failure.

He stayed fifth until the second round of pitstops when he exited before the fuel hose was properly disengaged from his car and left one of the mechanics with a fractured toe. Two laps later, he suffered a similar engine failure to Massa in the previous race; a connecting rod in his engine broke and he was forced to retire.

He passed Kovalainen and Massa at the start to be second, and took the lead from Hamilton on the second lap. He pulled away, setting the fastest lap of the race and built a five-second gap. He looked set to win but owing to a late-race rain shower, Hamilton closed right up to him and tried to pass him at the final chicane with two laps to go. Hamilton cut the chicane and rejoined ahead of Räikkönen. He let Räikkönen take the place back. Hamilton then repassed him for the lead. The two battled on for the rest of the lap, with Räikkönen retaking the lead when the two stumbled upon spinning backmarker Nico Rosberg, forcing Hamilton onto the grass. Räikkönen spun at the next corner and fell behind Hamilton again. While trying to catch up, he lost control of the car, smashed into a wall and retired.

He stayed in 14th position for the first two stints. He climbed to ninth position in the third and last stint in which he also set the fastest lap of the race.

In Singapore, the first night event in Formula One history, Räikkönen qualified third behind Massa and Hamilton. He remained in this position for most of the early laps. On lap 14, Nelson Piquet Jr.'s Renault hit the wall at turn 17 and the safety car was deployed. Both Ferrari drivers pitted during the safety car period, with Räikkönen queued behind Massa in a busy pitlane. Ferrari released Massa before the fuel hose was disconnected from the car, which compromised Räikkönen who rejoined in 16th. Räikkönen managed to climb to fifth place, but on lap 57, while attacking Timo Glock, he hit the wall after pushing too hard at turn 10 and retired. He set the fastest lap of the race as his 10th of the season. This equalled Michael Schumacher's 2004 record of ten fastest laps in a Formula One season.

Closing up to turn 1, Hamilton attempted to pass on the inside, braked late and went wide, forcing Räikkönen to also go wide. Räikkönen lost out heavily and went down to seventh position. He gained places after a collision between Hamilton and Massa, Kovalainen's hydraulic failure and an overtaking manoeuvre on Jarno Trulli. He eventually finished third, behind Renault's Fernando Alonso and BMW Sauber's Robert Kubica. This result meant that it was impossible for Räikkönen to retain his Drivers' Championship title for the second year.

In China, Räikkönen qualified second behind Hamilton. At the start he stayed second with his teammate and now Ferrari's world championship contender, Massa, behind him in third place. However, with Räikkönen out of the running for the world championship he let Massa through into second place on lap 49, to help the latter gain two additional points in his pursuit of Hamilton in the world championship race.

As Kubica failed to score, he finished third in the championship.

Räikkönen also won the DHL Fastest Lap Award for the second year in a row. He set 10 fastest laps throughout the season.

2009

The pace of the Ferraris and McLarens in particular was significantly slower than the likes of the Brawn, Red Bull and other outfits who were struggling to keep up with them in 2008. In the race, both Ferraris were running well before Räikkönen hit a barrier. He was forced to make an unscheduled pit stop on lap 43 and subsequently retired with differential failure.

In Malaysia, Räikkönen topped the time sheet in the second practice session. Räikkönen was ninth in qualifying. Sebastian Vettel and Rubens Barrichello's ten and five-place penalties respectively meant that he was promoted to seventh. During the race, rain was predicted and the team took a gamble to change Räikkönen to full wet tyres while the track was still dry. The gamble did not pay off, and Räikkönen fell down the field. By the time the race was stopped on the 33rd lap due to torrential rain, Räikkönen was classified 14th.

Räikkönen's season did not get any better in Round 3 in China where he qualified in eighth place. In the wet race, he and Lewis Hamilton had duels early on, with Hamilton having to overtake Räikkönen three times to get the job done. Räikkönen complained about power loss from the engine from near the start and of a lack of grip after his one and only pit-stop. This meant that he could only finish 10th. In Bahrain, Räikkönen secured sixth place and Ferrari's first points of the year, but was disappointed by the team's performance. He retired from the  due to a hydraulics failure after qualifying from the back of the grid.

He admitted that he was still disappointed because he missed out on pole narrowly to the Brawn of Jenson Button. Räikkönen lost out to Rubens Barrichello at the start of the race, dropping back to third. He maintained this position until the chequered flag.

He could only finish ninth, out of the points. However, he dropped to eighth during the pit stops because of traffic and remained until the finish.

In the race however he collided with the Force India of Adrian Sutil like in the previous year in Monte Carlo, as the German was emerging from a pitstop. While Sutil managed to recover back to the pits to replace a nosecone, Räikkönen was forced to retire a few laps later with radiator damage as a result of the incident.

After the first corner Räikkönen was in fourth place, but when Fernando Alonso retired after his early first stop, Räikkönen moved up to third. Räikkönen overtook Webber for second place at the first round of pit stops when Räikkönen and Webber pitted on the same lap. Räikkönen had a clean pit-stop, whereas Webber had a problem and was released into the path of the Ferrari. Räikkönen and Webber avoided collision, and Webber had to slot in behind Räikkönen. On his second pit stop, Räikkönen had a problem with an exhaust pipe. However, having built quite a gap between him and Webber, he held on to take second place.

He jumped to fourth at the start of the race. He then moved up to third after the second pit stops jumping Heikki Kovalainen for the last podium place, and stayed in that position until the end of the race, claiming his second straight podium.

After the safety car was removed, he passed Giancarlo Fisichella to take the race lead and led all the way to the chequered flag for his first race win in 25 races, and the first and only one for Ferrari in 2009. It was Räikkönen's fourth victory in the last five Belgian Grands Prix, bolstering his reputation as "The King of Spa".

It was his fourth consecutive podium finish.

Singapore saw the end of a great run for Räikkönen where he only finished 10th after qualifying 12th.

In Japan, Räikkönen came very close to another podium, finishing fourth. He had qualified fifth and was not able to gain a place at the start of the race, as he was on hard tyres. He put on softs for his second stint and was able to close in on Nick Heidfeld at about three-quarters of a second every lap. He overtook the German after the BMW Sauber came out of the pits. However, an accident involving Toro Rosso's Jaime Alguersuari brought out the safety car on lap 44, which kept the field stationary for a further five laps. Despite Hamilton suffering a KERS failure, Räikkönen's car did not have the grip necessary and was not able to overtake the third-placed McLaren at the restart. He went wide in an attempt to overtake Hamilton but recovered without losing a further place to Nico Rosberg.

In Brazil, Räikkönen qualified fifth and finished sixth. His race was already ruined when Mark Webber swerved into his path, damaging the Ferrari's front wing. At the pit stop while having the wing changed, fuel dripping from the fuel rig stuck on Kovalainen's car caused the Ferrari to briefly burst in flames as the two cars were exiting their pit stops. For the rest of the race even with his eyes burning from fuel, Räikkönen used his strategy to move up the order and eventually finished in sixth place.

In Abu Dhabi, the last race of the season, Räikkönen qualified 11th. He lost a place at the start of the race to Kamui Kobayashi. Räikkönen finished 12th, out of the points.

Leaving Formula One (2010–2011)
He would be replaced by Fernando Alonso. He was expected to return to McLaren alongside Lewis Hamilton but negotiations with the team failed. Räikkönen was then linked to Mercedes GP but the team eventually signed Michael Schumacher and Nico Rosberg. Toyota F1, before it pulled out of Formula One, offered Räikkönen a driving contract to replace Timo Glock in 2010. The BBC reported that he refused the contract owing to wanting to drive a race-winning car, not to mention Toyota not offering a large enough salary.

On 17 November 2009, his manager Steve Robertson confirmed that Räikkönen would not drive in Formula One in the 2010 season. This followed a resurgence in Renault's form, and the fact that the Russian Vitaly Petrov had yet to be re-signed like team-mate Robert Kubica. Team principal Éric Boullier claimed he had been contacted by Räikkönen in connection with a possible return, but said that although he was flattered by Räikkönen's alleged display of interest:

However Räikkönen angrily shot down the suggestion that he would race, claiming that Renault had simply used his name for "their own marketing purposes".

Return to Formula One (2012–2021)

Lotus (2012–2013)

Several reports went so far as to suggest that Räikkönen had entered preliminary negotiations with the team. However, the team refused to comment on the reports, with driver Rubens Barrichello dismissing them as rumour and speculation. On 29 November 2011, it was announced that Räikkönen would be returning to Formula 1 in 2012, signing a two-year contract with Lotus.

2012
Räikkönen began the season by qualifying 17th for the  after making a mistake on his last flying lap. However, he recovered his weekend during the race the next day, as he made a good start to move up to twelfth, before making it into the top ten. He took three places on the last lap of the race, to finish in seventh place. In the dry qualifying session for the  Räikkönen qualified in fifth place. He started the race from 10th place because of an unscheduled gearbox change. In the race he had the opportunity to try Pirelli's wet-weather tyres for the first time. He finished the race in fifth despite being inexperienced with Pirelli's wet-weather tyres compared to most of the other drivers. At the  he was 14th after running second before being overtaken by 10 cars in the space of one lap, due to a mistake in tyre strategy, expecting the Pirelli tyres to last longer in the last stint. At the  he finished second starting from 11th position on the grid. It was his first podium and his best finish of this comeback. In the  Räikkönen qualified in eighth but finished one place lower in ninth place. For the  Räikkönen again had a bad qualifying session finishing 12th. He was able to finish eighth in the race taking, as he stated, "important championship points". In the  he finished fifth, after having qualified in sixth place. At the start of Q2 the rain was already heavy meaning that Räikkönen lost the advantage he had in dry conditions. In the wet Q3 session he qualified in 10th place. Good pace in dry conditions from the qualifying session was proven in the race as Räikkönen succeeded to finish fourth, and eventually gaining the last podium spot after Sebastian Vettel was penalised for an illegal overtaking manoeuvre. For the  Räikkönen qualified fifth. He lost fifth place at the start to Alonso due to a KERS issue on his E20 car. He succeeded in gaining a position over Alonso during the first round of pit-stops, and later did the same to Button and Vettel during the second round. He finished the race in second place, just one second behind the race winner Hamilton.

That did not stop Räikkönen from qualifying fourth. He went on to finish third behind Jenson Button and Sebastian Vettel. The  saw the introduction of a coanda style exhaust system and several other minor updates to the Lotus E20 which, Lotus team boss Éric Boullier regarded as a new era in his team's development race. Räikkönen eventually qualified fifth and finished the race in fifth after an impressive battle with Hamilton which ended in Räikkönen's favour. Even though he was 48 points behind the championship leader Sebastian Vettel after 16 rounds of the  season, Räikkönen said he took inspiration from the  season which he won at the last round in  after Lewis Hamilton suffered gearbox problems. He could not manage to improve his starting position because of a lack of top speed on the straights. After this race, the contract with Lotus was extended for  due to the fact that the terms of options in the contract have been met. On 4 November 2012, Räikkönen won his first race for the Lotus F1 team at the  after a good start from fourth saw him take Pastor Maldonado and Mark Webber at the first corner. He was unable to match the pace of Hamilton, but a mechanical issue retired the McLaren and allowed Räikkönen to win the race, despite pressure from the Ferrari of Alonso in the closing stages. Although he was now mathematically eliminated from the championship as a result of Vettel finishing third, the Lotus name celebrated its first win since the 1987 Detroit Grand Prix which was won by Ayrton Senna. Still third, Räikkönen was 16 points clear of Hamilton in the championship. But after Hamilton's pole position at the concluding race of 2012, Räikkönen would have to finish at least fifth in the race if Hamilton were to win. He qualified only ninth. On lap 52, Räikkönen, who had been in-and-out of the points frequently, made a mistake and went off the track and tried to use an escape road to re-enter the track rather than drive over the grass. The road was blocked and he was forced to turn back. He lost numerous places and found himself behind a Caterham and a Marussia. He skidded again to be lapped, but re-claimed the lost places and with a retirement from Hamilton, finished the race in 10th and claimed his third place in the standings, with a 1-point contribution to the tally. He ended the season 71 points behind Alonso and 74 points behind champion Sebastian Vettel.

On 3 December 2012 through a poll in a French auto racing website, www.toileF1.com Räikkönen was named the driver of the year.

2013
On 29 October 2012, Lotus confirmed that Räikkönen would be racing with the team in 2013, after several weeks of speculation that Räikkönen had several other options for 2013, including other forms of motorsport.

On 17 March 2013 he won the first race of the season, the  despite starting from seventh, thanks to a two-stop strategy while most of the others did three stops. He also set the fastest lap of the race on lap 56. He described the victory as one of his easiest wins. Räikkönen qualified seventh in Malaysia, but was demoted three places for impeding Nico Rosberg during qualifying. He finished the race seventh, behind team-mate Grosjean, after damaging his car at the start.

In the  he qualified ninth, but was promoted to eighth after Lewis Hamilton received a five-place grid penalty for an unscheduled gearbox change. He finished the race second ahead of his team-mate Romain Grosjean, with Sebastian Vettel winning the race. The podium of the race was exactly same as in 2012. At the next race in Monaco, Räikkönen started fifth but an aggressive overtake by Pérez gave him a puncture and dropped him out of the points until a last-ditch attempt on the final lap where he overtook Esteban Gutiérrez, Valtteri Bottas and Nico Hülkenberg to gain 10th place. In the process, it continued his streak of 23 consecutive points finishes, one shy of the record of 24 set by Michael Schumacher across three seasons between 2001 and 2003.

He finished fifth but believed second place could have been possible had he pitted during the safety car period. The result kept him in third place in the championship. He qualified sixth but finished second – for the fifth time at the circuit – holding off a last minute charge from Vettel with fresher tyres. The result promoted him to second in the Drivers' Championship, one point ahead of Fernando Alonso and 38 points behind championship leader, Vettel.

Although Räikkönen did gain some places in the race, he was eventually forced to retire with a brake related issue on lap 27, ending the Finn's record-breaking run – also numbering 27 – of consecutive points finishes. The DNF also ended his chances of beating the most consecutive race finishes – a record held by Nick Heidfeld at 41 finishes – Räikkönen recorded 38.

He failed to score again at the  after losing his front wing at the start. He managed to make his way up the order, but was unable to pass Jenson Button for a point scoring position. On the week following the race, it was announced that Räikkönen would not continue with Lotus for the  season, and instead join Fernando Alonso at Ferrari. Before the following , it was revealed that Räikkönen had not been paid salary by Lotus for the whole season, meaning there were several million euros of outstanding fees. Räikkönen publicly cited this as the reason for leaving Lotus for Ferrari.

He qualified only 13th, but was still able to return to the podium, clawing to the third place partly thanks to a safety car intervention in the middle of the race.

In the race, he opted for a one-stop tyre strategy, placing him in the second place at the closing stages of the Grand Prix. However, during the final few laps, his pace was more than a second slower than those chasing him, including Nico Rosberg and Räikkönen's Lotus teammate Romain Grosjean. With eight laps remaining, Rosberg was able to take over Räikkönen for second. Grosjean then caught up with Räikkönen on the fourth last lap, but was not immediately able to pass him. At this point, the Lotus trackside operations director Alan Permane had a heated radio exchange with Räikkönen, commanding him to move out of the way. The radio conversation was widely noted in the press, raising questions about the health of his relationship with the team. Räikkönen eventually finished seventh after stopping for new tyres with only two laps to go.

In the following  questions about Räikkönen's relationship with his team were further fuelled by his absence from the usual Thursday media events. Räikkönen had reportedly only left his home at the last moment to make it to the Grand Prix after considering not racing at all in the event. On Friday, Räikkönen then publicly threatened that he would not continue to race with Lotus in the remaining two Grands Prix of the season after Abu Dhabi unless the salary dispute was resolved. In the Saturday's qualifying, Räikkönen made it to fifth, but was demoted to the 22nd and last grid spot due to his E21 car failing a post-qualifying floor deflection test. In the race, he immediately made contact with Giedo van der Garde's Caterham in the first corner of the first lap and broke his Lotus's right front suspension, forcing Räikkönen to retire on the first lap for the first time since the 2006 United States Grand Prix. Immediately after being recovered, he left the circuit and returned to his hotel while the race continued, further fuelling tensions between him and the team. Despite this, following the race, it was announced that Lotus and Räikkönen had reached a provisional agreement on the salary dispute that would see Räikkönen race for the team during the remainder of the season as the investment group Quantum Motorsports said that they had concluded long-running negotiations with Lotus for acquisition of a share in the team, providing the team with financial security.

However, a week before the following , it was announced that Räikkönen would nevertheless miss the rest of the season, having elected to have back surgery for the problems that had troubled him in the Singapore Grand Prix. For the remaining two Grands Prix, Räikkönen would be replaced at Lotus by fellow Finn Heikki Kovalainen.

Return to Ferrari (2014–2018)

He revealed that it was for monetary reasons that he left Lotus.

2014
A rule change for the 2014 season allowed drivers to pick a unique car number that they will use for their entire F1 career. Räikkönen however decided to retain the No. 7 car number he used for Lotus during the 2013 season as "It's the number I already had last year and I saw no reason to change it". Räikkönen would later admit he thought about taking No. 6 (the number he was assigned when he won the 2007 championship), but knew that Nico Rosberg would want the number as it was used by his father, Keke Rosberg, when he won the championship in 1982.

After getting a great start, Räikkönen was on for a podium finish at the Monaco Grand Prix. However, Max Chilton punctured Räikkönen's left-rear tyre while unlapping himself during a safety car period, forcing Räikkönen to make a second pitstop. Räikkönen then set the fastest lap of the race on lap 75, but finished 12th.

After a mostly disappointing first half of the season, Räikkönen had a return to form at the first race back after the summer break in Belgium, where a good strategy and a series of fastest laps earned him fourth place, his best result of the season. It was also the first time Räikkönen had finished higher in a race than Alonso in 2014. Räikkönen ended the 2014 season a career-low 12th in the Drivers' Championship, and for the first time since his rookie year, did not finish on the podium. Throughout the season, Räikkönen struggled with the car's lack of turn-in on corner entry and the feeling of the new brake-by-wire systems, saying that "We try somehow to balance it out and try to have a front end on the car, but it is very, very difficult. I hate it when there is no front end on the car."

Räikkönen remained with Ferrari for the 2015 season, partnering former world champion Sebastian Vettel after Alonso announced his departure from the Scuderia.

2015

Räikkönen had to retire from the first race of the season in Australia due to a loose wheel following a pitstop. Following that mishap, he recovered to finish fourth both in Malaysia and China. However, he escaped a possible grid penalty. During the same weekend, his manager Steve Robertson suggested that Räikkönen was heading towards a contract extension with Ferrari. That would contradict previous suggestions from Räikkönen himself that he would 'probably' retire at the end of his Ferrari contract, and that 2015 would be his last season. In the process, Räikkönen recorded his first podium since the 2013 Korean Grand Prix for Lotus, and the first in his second spell with Ferrari – his most recent Ferrari podium was a third-place finish at the 2009 Italian Grand Prix. He also commented that, both the engine and downforce had been significantly improved and that the car handled much more to his liking. In a post-race interview, Ferrari team boss, Maurizio Arrivabene, described this result as a sign that Räikkönen "is back" and that he "showed what a race animal he is", also implying that if he had a few more race laps available, Räikkönen would have challenged Hamilton for the race win.

At the next race of the season in Barcelona, Räikkönen was unhappy with the setup of the car and was able to qualify only in seventh place. However, he had a good opening lap in the race and made up 2 places to finish the race in fifth position. Räikkönen termed Monaco GP qualifying session to be a "disaster"; he was only able to qualify in sixth position, with his teammate Sebastian Vettel qualifying in third, followed by Daniel Ricciardo and Daniil Kvyat in the Red Bulls. In the race, Räikkönen was able to move up to fifth place, before being controversially overtaken by Ricciardo, and thus held his qualifying position to finish the race in sixth. Räikkönen put up a strong qualifying performance at Montreal to take third on the grid behind the two Mercedes drivers. During the race, while on the out-lap from a pitstop, Räikkönen suffered a repeat of the incident at the previous year's race and spun at the hairpin, which was attributed to an engine torque mapping issue. This caused him to lose his third place to Valtteri Bottas. In the Austrian Grand Prix he was involved in a big crash with Fernando Alonso which left Alonso's McLaren on top of Räikkönen's Ferrari. However both left unscathed. After a disappointing showing caused by changing weather in Great Britain, Räikkönen bounced back strongly running second behind Vettel looking set for a 1–2 in Hungary, when a technical failure regarding the energy recovery system meant he lost straightline speed. An untimely safety car meant losing further positions after the restart and after a pitstop to re-fire the engine meant he dropped out of the points he retired when the problem did not fix itself as he had lost the chance to get back past any cars.

On 19 August, Ferrari announced that Räikkönen had extended his contract with the team for the 2016 season, taking his total tally with the team to six seasons spread out over a total of ten years. Räikkönen said that 'his dream went on' and confirmed that he wanted Ferrari to be the team where he ended his career. At the race following the announcement (Spa), miscommunication from the team coupled with gearbox change penalties saw Räikkönen start from 17th on the grid. However, he managed to overtake the middle pack and finished the race in seventh, after teammate Sebastian Vettel had a tire blowout on the 42nd lap causing him to lose a third-place finish.

Räikkönen qualified on the front row for Ferrari's home race at Monza, but a complete lack of movement for a few seconds at the start saw him drop down the order. Showing good pace however, he managed to pick his way from the back of the field to fifth. Räikkönen blamed a 'clutch positioning' problem, while team boss Arrivabene suggested Räikkönen had caused the anti-stall to kick in himself due to 'messing with his fingers' although he clarified it saying he did not fully know at the time. Nevertheless, he remained at one podium of the season, as teammate Vettel finished second to take his tally to eight in twelve races.

At the Singapore Grand Prix, Räikkönen showed consistent performances in the practice sessions and qualified in third, behind Sebastian Vettel and Daniel Ricciardo. Räikkönen maintained the position through the race despite being uncomfortable with the car, to take his second podium finish of the season. Räikkönen ended the season by finishing third in the season-ending Abu Dhabi Grand Prix to take his third podium of the year and securing fourth place in the Drivers' Championship.

2016
For the second year in a row, Räikkönen had to retire from the first race of the season in Australia, after a fire broke out in his airbox. Räikkönen finished in the second place at the Bahrain Grand Prix while his teammate Sebastian Vettel did not start the race after his car broke down on formation lap. Räikkönen outpaced teammate Sebastian Vettel in qualifying at the Chinese Grand Prix to take third on the grid, however a first lap collision with Vettel saw him damaging his front wing and he dropped down the order, he then showed good pace to move up the field and eventually finished fifth. He managed to finish the Russian Grand Prix in third place after a huge start collision, which left his teammate Vettel out of the race. This was also the 700th podium in Ferrari's Formula One history. Räikkönen finished behind Max Verstappen in second place to take his third podium of the season in the Spanish Grand Prix finishing ahead of his teammate Vettel who was third.

Räikkönen showed greatly improved qualifying performances during the 2016 season, out-qualifying teammate Vettel 11–10.

2017

Räikkönen started the 2017 season with fourth in Australia, fifth in China and then again fourth in Bahrain. Räikkönen scored his first podium of the season at the following Russian Grand Prix, finishing third. He retired from the Spanish Grand Prix after being involved in an incident on the first lap.

He finished the race second after Vettel had a superior strategy, giving Ferrari their first 1–2 finish since 2010. Räikkönen finished seventh in Canada after struggling with brake problems. He qualified third at the Azerbaijan Grand Prix, but retired from the race with an oil leak. He then finished fifth in Austria.

Räikkönen qualified second at the British Grand Prix, but suffered a tyre failure late in the race while in second place, however he still managed to finish third, ahead of teammate Vettel. In the race, after Vettel – who was in first position – made his pitstop first, Räikkönen was driving faster than him on older tyres, but Ferrari pitted Räikkönen early to defend Vettel from cars behind him, denying Räikkönen a chance of overcutting Vettel, eventually finishing second. He then finished fourth in Belgium and fifth in Italy. Räikkönen qualified fourth at the Singapore Grand Prix, but after getting a great start, was hit by Max Verstappen, who avoided Vettel's aggressive move across the circuit, which ultimately ended up in a crash that put all three drivers out of the race.

In Malaysia he qualified second but did not start the race because of a technical problem. After a fifth place at the Japanese Grand Prix, Räikkönen finished third at the United States Grand Prix. A fourth-place finish in Abu Dhabi secured fourth position in the drivers' championship for Räikkönen.

2018

Räikkönen renewed his contract with Ferrari for the  season on 22 August 2017. He qualified second for the first race in Australia and finished third, after being jumped by Vettel during the virtual safety car period. At the Bahrain Grand Prix, he qualified second after encountering traffic on his last run. He then ran in third for most of the race, but retired on lap 35 due to a pit stop error by Ferrari. He went on to finish third at the Chinese Grand Prix after recovering from a strategy aimed at helping his teammate.

At the Azerbaijan Grand Prix, Räikkönen recovered from a first lap incident with Esteban Ocon to eventually finish second. Räikkönen's engine failed during practice at the Spanish Grand Prix, forcing him to change engines. This meant that he missed Ferrari's upgraded engine introduced two races later in Canada and had to race with the old specification engine until the 13th round in Belgium to avoid a penalty. His engine failed again in the race in Spain, forcing him to retire from the race, but the engine did not have to be replaced. This was followed by a fourth-place finish in Monaco and sixth in Canada.

A third-place finish in the French Grand Prix started a run of consecutive podiums for Räikkönen. He would finish second at the following Austrian Grand Prix, then at the British Grand Prix he recovered from a controversial 10-second penalty to finish third, after which he finished third again at the German and Hungarian Grands Prix to score five consecutive podiums. At the Belgian Grand Prix, Räikkönen had strong pace during qualifying, but a fuel miscalculation by Ferrari meant that he could not complete a lap in the drying conditions later in session which left him sixth on the grid. He retired from the race as his car was damaged in a first lap crash initiated by Nico Hülkenberg.

Räikkönen took pole position at the Italian Grand Prix, breaking Juan Pablo Montoya's 14-year-old record to set the fastest lap ever recorded in Formula One history with an average speed of 263.588 kilometres per hour (163.786 mph) and a laptime of 1:19.119. His race was compromised by Mercedes ordering Bottas to block him after his pit stop, but he nevertheless finished second to score his 100th podium finish, becoming only the fifth driver ever to do so. This was followed by a fifth-place finish in Singapore, fourth in Russia and fifth in Japan, where his car sustained damage from a hit by Verstappen.

Räikkönen won the United States Grand Prix, becoming, at 39, F1's oldest race winner since Nigel Mansell in 1994, and the 13th oldest F1 race winner ever. It was his first win since the 2013 Australian Grand Prix 2,044 days earlier, his first win for Ferrari since he returned to the team back in 2014, his first win for Ferrari since the 2009 Belgian Grand Prix 3,339 days and 140 races earlier, and his first win in the hybrid era. This victory made Räikkönen the most successful Finnish driver of all time in terms of race wins. He broke the record for the longest gap between Grand Prix wins (113 races) and the record for the biggest gap between first and last career wins (5,691 days). Coincidentally, this victory came on the 11th anniversary of his 2007 F1 world championship. He followed this victory with third-placed podiums at the Mexican and Brazilian Grands Prix. He retired in Abu Dhabi with an electrical issue, but nonetheless, despite four retirements that were not caused by him, he finished third in the Drivers' Championship in his final season with Ferrari.

Alfa Romeo (2019–2021)

2019

Räikkönen made his Sauber return in the postseason Abu Dhabi Pirelli tyre test driving their 2018 car. The Sauber team was renamed Alfa Romeo Racing prior to the start of the  season.

Räikkönen had an impressive first half of the season, scoring 31 points before the summer break, placing him eighth in the Drivers' Championship after 12 races. In comparison, his teammate Antonio Giovinazzi had scored only a single point during the same period. However, after the summer break, the Alfa Romeo Racing C38 struggled for pace and Räikkönen endured a seven-race pointless streak. He had an opportunity to score points in Belgium, starting from sixth on the grid, but he was hit by Max Verstappen at the first corner. Räikkönen finished 12th in the Drivers' Championship with 43 points, which, again, was the best result for a driver of the Hinwil-based team since 2013.

2020

Räikkönen remained at the Alfa Romeo Racing team for the 2020 season. The team's Ferrari-powered car proved to be one of the slowest cars of the season, and the team was left fighting at the back of the grid against Haas and Williams. During the season Räikkönen scored points twice, finishing ninth at the Tuscan Grand Prix and again ninth at the Emilia Romagna Grand Prix, while he scored the team's best qualifying result with eighth in Turkey. During the Italian Grand Prix at Monza, Räikkönen ran as high as second after a red flag and penalties to Lewis Hamilton and Giovinazzi, however ultimately finished 11th and outside the points. These results placed him 16th in the drivers' standings with four points, ahead of teammate Antonio Giovinazzi and the Haas and Williams drivers. Räikkönen was the highest finishing driver among this group in nine of the season's 17 races, while he finished ahead of his teammate in nine of the 13 races which both finished and qualified ahead of him eight times. He was also the highest finishing Ferrari-powered driver on four occasions.

Räikkönen's 323rd Formula One race start at the Eifel Grand Prix saw him break Rubens Barrichello's record for most Formula One race starts in history. He won the FIA Action of the Year award for his opening lap at the Portuguese Grand Prix, where he overtook 10 cars.

2021

Räikkönen continued with Alfa Romeo in  alongside Giovinazzi. Before the season started Räikkönen had decided to retire at the end of the season. He tested positive for COVID-19 on the weekend of the Dutch Grand Prix and was replaced by reserve driver Robert Kubica at the Dutch and Italian Grand Prix. Räikkönen scored his first points of the season in Azerbaijan, with more points in Hungary, Russia and Mexico. In November he visited the Alfa Romeo factory in Switzerland for the last time as a team member and was given a farewell, and was subsequently given a farewell by the Scuderia Ferrari team prior to the race in Abu Dhabi. For his final race in Abu Dhabi the team inscribed "Dear Kimi, we will leave you alone now" on his C41. Räikkönen was forced to retire on lap 25 because of a technical issue with a wheel nut. "It doesn't matter how it comes to the end, it's the end now and yes, I'm looking forward to it," he said after the race. Räikkönen finished the season in 16th place with 10 points.

Other racing

Rallying
Räikkönen made his initial rally debut at the Arctic Lapland Rally, which ran from 23 to 24 January 2009, driving a Tommi Mäkinen Racing-prepared Abarth Grande Punto S2000. He finished in 13th place. Räikkönen made his WRC debut in the 2009 Rally Finland, which took place between 30 July and 2 August, starting just four days after his second-place finish in the Hungarian Grand Prix. He was running third in group N and 15th overall before crashing out in Väärinmaja, last stage of Saturday.

On 4 December 2009, it was announced that Räikkönen would altogether shift from Formula 1 to the World Rally Championship for the 2010 season as a full-time driver for the Citroën Junior Team, and that he would be driving a Red Bull-sponsored Citroën C4 WRC with his co-driver, Kaj Lindström. As members of the team, the pair were scheduled to participate in 12 of 13 rallies in the 2010 WRC calendar, the exception being Rally New Zealand.

On 3 April 2010, Räikkönen scored his first WRC points when he finished eighth in the Jordan Rally. Consequently, he became the second driver after Carlos Reutemann to score championship points in both Formula One and the World Rally Championship. In the next WRC event, the Rally of Turkey, Räikkönen improved his best result with a fifth-place finish, 6m 44.3s off the winner, Sébastien Loeb. This result saw him beat established and more experienced drivers in the field.

In the 2010 Rally Finland, the retired four-time World Rally Champion Juha Kankkunen entered the race and said that if Räikkönen cannot beat him then he might as well go back to Formula One. The two were in a close battle for seventh until Räikkönen had a crash on the 12th stage of the rally. He finished seventh in the Rallye Deutschland, his second ever asphalt rally, while scoring his first ever career stage win on the last stage of the rally.

On 18 September 2010, Räikkönen achieved his first rally win when he participated in the Rallye Vosgien 2010 in France. He won all six stages in the asphalt rally. Räikkönen could not start in the Rally Catalunya because he crashed during the shakedown, leaving the roll cage damaged, and the team did not have enough time to repair it. Subsequently, Räikkönen decided to not take part in the rally at all, even when he could by super rally rules. The reason was stated to be saving the car. He would finish eighth in the Wales Rally GB, the final rally of the season. He scored 25 points during the season to finish 10th overall in the championship, the best result for a rookie that year.

Räikkönen entered the 2011 World Rally Championship season under his own team, ICE 1 Racing. He drove a Citroën DS3 WRC. He finished eighth in the opening round, Rally Sweden. Skipping the Mexico event, he next competed in Rally Portugal and finished seventh. He finished sixth in the following Jordan Rally, but would skip the next two rounds.

Räikkönen returned in the Acropolis Rally, finishing seventh. He would score points in his home rally, Rally Finland, after finishing ninth. He equaled his best result of the season with sixth in Rallye Deutschland, his seventh consecutive points finish and sixth consecutive points finish of the season. After the good form, the season ended in three retirements in the last three rallies. Räikkönen scored 34 points during the season, nine more than in 2010. Despite the increased number of points, he would again finish 10th in the championship.

NASCAR
It was reported on 29 March 2011 that Räikkönen would try his hand at NASCAR starting in the Camping World Truck Series sometime in the summer of 2011 with an eye on also running in the Nationwide and Sprint Cup Series. On 2 April Räikkönen signed a deal with Toyota team Kyle Busch Motorsports to run a limited schedule in the Truck Series. An earlier report claimed that Räikkönen's entry was related with former Richard Petty Motorsports executive Foster Gillett, whom Räikkönen announced would be a partner in his Ice 1 Racing team.

On 20 May, Räikkönen debuted at the North Carolina Education Lottery 200 at Charlotte Motor Speedway with a strong finish of 15th, though he started the day with tough practice sessions and qualified only at 31 out of 37 trucks. His race craft was well received by team crew chief Rick Ren and his teammate Kyle Busch. Räikkönen went on to race in the Nationwide Series at the same track on 28 May driving for Joe Nemechek and NEMCO Motorsports. He finished 27th after having debris stuck on the grille of his car and getting a penalty for speeding in the pitlane. Later in the month, Räikkönen tested Robby Gordon's car at Infineon Raceway, with plans of Gordon fielding a two-car team for him and Räikkönen at the Toyota/Save Mart 350. However, Räikkönen crashed the car in the test, and the deal with Robby Gordon Motorsports fell through.

In May 2022, Trackhouse Racing Team announced that Räikkönen would make his Cup Series debut in the number 91 Chevrolet at the 2022 Go Bowling at The Glen at Watkins Glen International. Having previously only driven the car in an acclimatisation test at Virginia International Raceway and one 20-minute practice session, Räikkönen qualified 27th out of 39 cars, notably ahead of fellow debutant Mike Rockenfeller and former Formula One driver Daniil Kvyat. In the race, he ran in the top ten at one point, but was classified 37th after crashing from 25th place following contact with Loris Hezemans trying to find a way past a spinning Austin Dillon.

Personal life
Räikkönen met Finnish model and former Miss Scandinavia 2001, Jenni Dahlman in 2002. The couple married on 31 July 2004, living between Switzerland and Finland. They separated in February 2013, and divorced in 2014. Räikkönen became engaged to fitness and underwear model Minna-Mari "Minttu" Virtanen. On 28 January 2015, Virtanen gave birth to the couple's first child, a son. On 7 August 2016, Räikkönen married Virtanen in a ceremony in Siena, Italy. On 16 May 2017, Räikkönen became a father for the second time with the birth of his daughter.

Räikkönen's hobbies include snowboarding and ice hockey. He has also competed in several different kinds of motorsport events. In March 2007, while his Formula One rivals were in Australia preparing for the season opener, Räikkönen competed in a snowmobile race in Finland under the pseudonym "James Hunt", referring to the 1976 world champion whose "playboy" lifestyle has been compared with Räikkönen's own. Räikkönen won the Enduro Sprint race by over 20 seconds with his Lynx. Later in the year, he and two friends entered a powerboat race in the Finnish harbour city of Hanko while wearing gorilla suits. Again, he raced under the name "James Hunt". They then won a prize for the best-dressed crew.

In August 2008, it was announced that Räikkönen would appear on a set of Finnish postage stamps. The stamps, which were released to commemorate the Finnish postal service's 370th anniversary, feature images of him racing and on the podium, with the words "F1 World Champion '07 Kimi Räikkönen".

In 2011, Räikkönen founded his own Motocross World Championship team, Ice 1 Racing. The team consists of MX1 rider Toni Eriksson and MX2 rider Ludde Söderberg and is managed by seven-time enduro world champion Kari Tiainen. The Ice 1 Racing team also supports six junior riders competing in the Finnish national championship.

In 2018, Ferrari filed legal action on behalf of Räikkönen with Canadian authorities. The complaint claimed Räikkönen was being extorted by a woman demanding compensation and threatening to publicly accuse him of sexual misconduct at a function after the 2016 Canadian Grand Prix.

Räikkönen stated in 2007 that he believes in God. He has claimed his favorite movie to be Scarface. Räikkönen is also recognized for having a distinctive voice. Räikkönen has said that the reason behind it is a bicycle accident that he suffered when he was 5-years-old. Räikkönen fell, hit his neck to the bicycle handlebar, and injured his vocal cords which never fully healed. Sebastian Vettel and Antonio Giovinazzi, his teammates from Ferrari and Alfa Romeo, are two of his close friends.

Public persona and reaction
Räikkönen is known for his dislike of giving media interviews, and frequently answers questions in a blunt and monosyllabic manner. In the build-up to the 2006 Brazilian Grand Prix when then-ITV pundit Martin Brundle asked Räikkönen why he missed a ceremony in which footballer Pelé presented Michael Schumacher with a lifetime achievement award, Räikkönen replied "I was having a shit."

During his early years at McLaren, Ron Dennis gave him the nickname, "Iceman", with several layers of meaning; apart from its association with the cold climate of Finland, he is widely considered to have a cool temperament under pressure and also an 'icy' persona with most other drivers, team members and the media. He has said that he is "not here to try to please people. I'm here to do my best". Apart from his on-track driving, off-track instances demonstrating this calm demeanour include being asleep 30 minutes before his first Formula One race and eating an ice cream during the temporarily-suspended 2009 Malaysian Grand Prix.

Known to be frustrated by anything that prevents him from simply racing, he is relatively outspoken in his criticism of politics and off-circuit drama in sport. In a rare feature interview in the middle of the 2013 season, Räikkönen said "sometimes in Formula 1 there is politics, and the shit there is stupid". In the same article, Lotus team principal Éric Boullier described Räikkönen as someone "doing pretty much whatever he wants".

During the 2006 Monaco Grand Prix his McLaren MP4-21 broke down as the heat shield had exploded and he was forced to retire; he went from his car straight to his nearby yacht, fully dressed in his racing suit and immediately relaxed in his jacuzzi.

Räikkönen's terse radio communications have sometimes attracted comment. On the 20th lap of the 2012 Abu Dhabi Grand Prix, Räikkönen had just taken the lead from Lewis Hamilton and his race engineer Simon Rennie advised that Fernando Alonso was five seconds behind and that he would be kept informed of Alonso's pace; Räikkönen replied, "Just leave me alone, I know what to do!" Later in the same race, he admonished his team again, when being told to manage the tyre temperature: "Yes, yes, yes, yes, I'm doing that all the time. You don't have to remind me every ten seconds!" The first quote attracted significant press coverage, and Räikkönen made no attempt to apologise in the post-race interview. It was earlier reported that he printed 500 T-shirts with the quote for the entire Lotus team, but this was later denied by Räikkönen in an interview with Formula One Group media personnel. The quote was featured on his official website.

Helmet

 

Räikkönen's helmet, designed by UffeDesigns, manufactured by Arai (2001–2006, 2012), Bell (2013, 2015–2021) and Schuberth (2007–2009, 2014), slightly changed during the years. The trident insignia was painted in white during his time racing for Sauber and McLaren until 2005, and red from 2006 with McLaren and during his time with Ferrari. His helmet has also always featured a V design running on the circle top (representing a flying bird) and the inscription "Iceman". In his debut race, his helmet was predominantly blue with white and silver details. When he joined McLaren in 2002 the design was left intact, only making the top circle all blue (rather than blue and silver) and with some black details on the chin area. In 2003–2005 his helmet was blue and white with some red and silver parts, red details were added on the symbol that was added to the M design. In 2006 his helmet was the same, only changing the blue to black with red and white lines on it. When racing for Ferrari Räikkönen's helmet changed radically: it was white with the middle part black and red with tribal designs and a black circle with the design in the top. In 2008, black paisley motifs were added in the chin. He retained this design in some rallies, although the helmet style was significantly different for this discipline.

In WRC and NASCAR he used a blue Stilo helmet with Red Bull's logo, silver and white accents (to resemble Red Bull's can design and Räikkönen's Sauber helmet lines), the symbol and the trident insignia (in white and red) and with the inscription "Iceman".

Upon his return to Formula One, he sported a black helmet with a white diagonal line crossing from each side until the angles of the visor and a thicker red diagonal line beneath the white line and a red number 9 in a corner of the white line (to allude to his car number), a white circle in the top with black edged designs (similar to horns) on the upper front. The design on the top became black and in the back of the helmet there was the inscription "Iceman" written in red letters. From the Australian Grand Prix, there were more details added on top of the helmet. For the Monaco Grand Prix, he wore a replica of the 1976 James Hunt helmet. The manufacturer of his helmet for the 2012 season was Arai.

In 2013, the helmet was similar to the previous season, but with the inverted colours (except for the red), the horn design in the upper front became red and on the sides there was a big red number 7 superimposed on the black section of the helmet. Unlike the 2012 model, the 2013 model is manufactured by Bell.

Upon his return to Ferrari in 2014, the base colour became a vibrant red, with white diagonal lines crossing from each side. A large number 7 was placed within the red, similar to that of 2013's. The "Iceman" inscription at the rear of the helmet was yellow, along with some of detailing around the top of the helmet. The manufacturer of his helmet for the 2014 season was officially Schuberth, yet it is believed that he continued using a Bell model for racing purposes.

In 2015, his helmet reverted to a white base, similar to the model he used back in 2007. The rear of the helmet reverted to black, with a red band above the "Iceman" inscription. The Insignia along the top was surrounded by red and grey detailing, and the large number 7 was bordered in grey. As of 2014, Räikkönen continued to race with a Bell model rather than Ferrari's official supplier Schuberth.

Other ventures
In 2022, after his retirement from Formula One, Räikkönen was named the team principal of the Kawasaki Racing Team for the 2022 season of the Motocross World Championship.

Karting record

Karting career summary

Racing record

Racing career summary

Complete Formula One results
(key) (Races in bold indicate pole position; races in italics indicate fastest lap)

† Did not finish, but was classified as he had completed more than 90% of the race distance.

Complete WRC results

NASCAR
(key) (Bold – Pole position awarded by qualifying time. Italics – Pole position earned by points standings or practice time. * – Most laps led.)

Cup Series

Nationwide Series

Camping World Truck Series

 Ineligible for series points.

Formula One records and achievements
 , he holds the third highest number of fastest laps at 46.
 In 2008, Räikkönen scored six consecutive fastest laps (in Spain, Turkey, Monaco, Canada, France and Britain), equalling Alberto Ascari's record for the most consecutive fastest laps in a single season and placing him one behind Ascari's overall record of seven consecutive fastest laps (which were split across two seasons: six in 1952 and one in 1953).
 He was the first driver to win on his Ferrari debut since Nigel Mansell at the 1989 Brazilian Grand Prix and the first to win, set the fastest lap and pole position on his Ferrari debut since Juan Manuel Fangio at the 1956 Argentine Grand Prix.

 The 2007 Chinese Grand Prix saw Räikkönen give Ferrari as a manufacturer their 200th Formula One GP win, as well as their 600th podium.
 At the 2008 French Grand Prix Räikkönen gave Ferrari their 200th pole position.
 The 2016 Russian Grand Prix saw Räikkönen give Scuderia Ferrari their 700th podium as a manufacturer (it was their 695th podium as a team).
 Räikkönen is the second driver to win the World Championship after being third in the drivers standings before the final race, when he did this at the 2007 Brazilian Grand Prix.
 He is the third Ferrari driver after Juan Manuel Fangio and Jody Scheckter to win the world title in their first year with the team.
 , he is the latest Ferrari driver to have won the World Drivers' Championship.
 He is the third Finnish driver to win the World Championship, after Keke Rosberg and Mika Häkkinen. , he is also the most successful Finnish Formula One driver in terms of points, podium finishes, fastest laps, and race wins.
 He achieved Lotus F1's first race win at the 2012 Abu Dhabi Grand Prix.
 , he has the most second and third placed podium finishes combined (82).
 , he holds the record for the most race starts between successive pole positions, with 129 starts between his pole positions at the 2008 French Grand Prix and 2017 Monaco Grand Prix.
 , he holds the record for the most races between Grand Prix wins, winning the 2018 United States Grand Prix 113 races after his 2013 Australian Grand Prix victory.
 , he also holds the record for the biggest gap between first and last career wins, winning the 2018 United States Grand Prix 5,691 days after his 2003 Malaysian Grand Prix victory.
 He is the only driver to win in the V10, V8 and the V6 turbo hybrid engine eras.
 In August 2020, at the Spanish Grand Prix, Räikkönen broke the F1 distance record that was previously held by Fernando Alonso.
 At the 2020 Eifel Grand Prix, Räikkönen broke the record of 322 F1 race starts.
 At the 2020 Portuguese Grand Prix, Räikkönen broke the record of 326 F1 entries.

See also
 The "Flying Finns"

Notes and references

Notes

References

Bibliography

External links

 
 Formula One DataBase: Kimi Räikkönen
 
 

 
1979 births
Living people
Alfa Romeo Formula One drivers
British Formula Renault 2.0 drivers
Ferrari Formula One drivers
Finnish expatriate sportspeople in Germany
Finnish expatriate sportspeople in Japan
Finnish expatriates in Monaco
Finnish expatriate sportspeople in Switzerland
Finnish expatriate sportspeople in the United Kingdom
Finnish Formula One drivers
Finnish racing drivers
Finnish rally drivers
Formula Ford drivers
Formula One race winners
Formula One World Drivers' Champions
Formula Renault Eurocup drivers
Karting World Championship drivers
Lotus F1 Formula One drivers
McLaren Formula One drivers
Motorcycle racing team owners
NASCAR drivers
Sauber Formula One drivers
Sportspeople from Espoo
World Rally Championship drivers
Manor Motorsport drivers
Haywood Racing drivers
Citroën Racing drivers
Kyle Busch Motorsports drivers